Brachinus bellicosus is a species of ground beetle in the Brachininae subfamily that can be found in France, Portugal, and Spain.

References

Brachininae
Beetles of Europe
Beetles described in 1820
Taxa named by Léon Jean Marie Dufour